Eileen Küpper is a South Africa-born soprano singer, known for her work with metal bands Therion and The Kovenant.

Discography

Solo
 Shapes (2003)

With Therion
 Vovin (1998)
 Crowning of Atlantis (1999)
 Deggial (2000)

With The Kovenant
 Animatronic (1999)
 SETI (2003)

References

External links
Profile at TOCA-Records 

Year of birth missing (living people)
Living people
Women heavy metal singers
21st-century South African women singers
Therion (band) members
20th-century South African women singers
The Kovenant members